Yael Rubinstein is an Israeli diplomat who began her diplomatic career in 2003. Rubinstein was Israel's Ambassador to Singapore from 2013–2017, after having previously served as Ambassador to Thailand and Ambassador to Cambodia.

Education
BA in Economics and International relations from the Hebrew University of Jerusalem in 1982
MA in Economics in 1983, Hebrew University of Jerusalem. 
In 2011, she completed an MA in Political Science at Haifa University.

Diplomatic career

In 2003, Rubinstein served as Ambassador Extraordinary & Plenipotentiary (non-resident) of Slovakia, Slovenia and Croatia  while concurrently serving at the Central Europe Department in the Israeli Ministry of Foreign Affairs.

In 2005–2009, Rubinstein served as Ambassador of Israel to Thailand and Cambodia. In 2008, Rubinstein organized the first performance in Thailand of Zubin Mehta and the Israel Philharmonic Orchestra.

At the Cybertech Singapore conference in February 2017, Ambassador Rubinstein presided over an extensive cyber cooperation agreement between Ben-Gurion University of the Negev and Singapore's Nanyang Technological University. First of its kind Cyber Cooperation Agreement signed between BGU and NTU]

Personal
Rubinstein was born in Israel. She is married to Dan Sherman, a gynecologist and obstetrician. She was married to Ariel Rubinstein. She has two children.

See also
Women of Israel
List of Israeli ambassadors

References

Living people
Year of birth missing (living people)
Israeli women ambassadors
University of Haifa alumni
Hebrew University of Jerusalem Faculty of Social Sciences alumni
Ambassadors of Israel to Singapore
Ambassadors of Israel to Thailand
Ambassadors of Israel to Cambodia
Ambassadors of Israel to Slovenia
Ambassadors of Israel to Slovakia
Ambassadors of Israel to Croatia